Zauzou may refer to:
Nu people or Zauzou
Zauzou language